The purple-tailed imperial pigeon (Ducula rufigaster) is a species of bird in the family Columbidae. It is found in New Guinea.

Its natural habitat is subtropical or tropical moist lowland forests.

References

External links

purple-tailed imperial pigeon
Birds of New Guinea
purple-tailed imperial pigeon
Taxonomy articles created by Polbot
Taxa named by Jean René Constant Quoy
Taxa named by Joseph Paul Gaimard